A schanze is, according to the specialist terminology of German fortification construction, an independent fieldwork, that is frequently used in the construction of temporary (not permanent) field fortifications. The word is German and has no direct English equivalent, although the word sconce is derived from Dutch schans, which is cognate to the German word.

In everyday German speech, however, it is commonplace to refer to  permanent fortifications as Schanzen, because in many places in times of war, fieldworks that were only temporarily thrown up were later turned into permanent fortifications.

Derivation 
The word Schanze derives originally from the fact that, during sieges in the Late Middle Ages, temporary defensive positions had frequently been built out of gabions, known in German as Schanzkörbe. Later such Schanzen very often consisted of earthen ramparts. As a result, in the 16th century, the verb schanzen became generally associated with earthworks of all kinds. In modern German military use, Schanzen is still used to mean the construction of smaller earthworks, especially of fire trenches. From this already derived usage comes the phrase  sich verschanzen, "to entrench oneself" in yet another derivative sense.

As defensive systems 

As a rule a schanze is an independent fortified work. To block a valley or a pass, however, a line of adjacent schanzen could be erected, not infrequently connected by a low rampart and ditch. In this case it is referred to as a verschanzte Linie – a fortified line of schanzen. If such a defensive line completely enclosed an area on all sides, it was described as a verschanztes Lager – a fortified (with schanzen) position. It was not uncommon in the 17th and 18th centuries for weaker armies to construct such works in order to protect themselves from a stronger foe. During sieges fortified lines of schanzen were often used as lines of contravallation or  circumvallation.

Depending on the layout, a distinction is made between "open" (offene) and "closed" (geschlossene) schanzen. The closed type are further divided into redoubts, that only have outward-facing angles, and "star schanzen" (Sternschanzen) with alternating inward and outward facing corners. In open schanzen, which may take the shape of a flèche, redan, half-redoubt, lunette, hornwork or even more complex designs, the gorge is open, i.e. the side where the army was encamped or on which their own defences lay, was unfortified.

There is a very extensive system of schanzen in the Black Forest, elements of which have survived. See Baroque fortifications in the Black Forest.

Another famous schanze is the Wolf's Lair located near the town of Rastenburg in the north-eastern part of Poland. This military installation was Adolf Hitler's command headquarters from which he commanded Operation Barbarossa.

See also 
 Baroque Schanzen
 Sconce (fortification)
Wolfsschanze

References and footnotes

Other sources 
 Schanze in Meyers Konversations-Lexikon 4th edn. 1888 ff., Vol. 14, p. 403
 Replica of a hexagonal redoubt at 1:1 scale with a link to the construction diary

External links 

Fortifications by type

de:Schanze (Festungsbau)